Masego "Lucky" Malakia Loate (born August 19, 1982), is a South African professional basketball player. He currently plays for the North West Eagles of the Basketball National League in South Africa.

He represented South Africa's national basketball team at the 2011 FIBA Africa Championship in Antananarivo, Madagascar, where he was his team's best 3 point shooter.

References

External links
 FIBA profile
 Afrobasket.com profile
 REAL GM profile

1982 births
Living people
Point guards
South African men's basketball players
Sportspeople from Soweto